25 Flight Army Air Corps is a flight within the British Army's Army Air Corps, currently part of the British Army Training Unit Kenya.

History
The flight was formed in 1987 in Belize where it operated Sioux AH1 helicopters. The flight returned to Middle Wallop in August 2011. The flight supported UK peacetime operations and training including the security arrangements for the 2012 Summer Olympics which were held mostly in London but also at smaller locations throughout the UK. In March 2013 the flight deployed to Kenya where it supports the British Army Training Unit Kenya (BATUK). The flight's primary role is to provide 24/7 Medical Evacuation (MEDEVAC) cover to exercising troops training in the remote locations within Kenya as well as to BATUK dependents and permanent staff.  The secondary role to provide range clearance prior to live firing. The flight has three Bell 212 helicopters.

See also

 List of Army Air Corps aircraft units

References

Army Air Corps independent flights
Military units and formations established in 1987